Oh Julie may refer to:

 "Oh Julie" (The Crescendos song), covered by Sammy Salvo
 "Oh Julie" (Shakin' Stevens song), covered by Barry Manilow